Sabalia thalia is a moth in the family Brahmaeidae (older classifications placed it in Lemoniidae). It was described by James Farish Malcolm Fawcett in 1915.

References

Brahmaeidae
Moths described in 1915